Parvidens may refer to:

Cheiromeles parvidens, species of bat in the family Molossidae
Hylogomphus parvidens, species of dragonfly in family Gomphidae
Lipochromis sp. nov. 'parvidens-like', species of fish in the family Cichlidae
Mautodontha parvidens, species of gastropod in the family Charopidae
 Parvidens, a genus of fly (Psychodidae, Phlebotominae)